
The Von Braun Center for Science & Innovation (VCSI ) is a non-profit research and development organization based in Huntsville, Alabama and is named for pioneering aerospace engineer Wernher von Braun.   VCSI is affiliated with NASA, Department of Defense and other federal government agencies.

The center facilitates transfer of intellectual property between government agencies and private companies, also known as "spinoff" technologies. The center has also coordinated university research and development efforts in the Gulf of Mexico on behalf of NOAA

VCSI is a contributor to the Rocket City Space Pioneers efforts towards the Google Lunar X Prize.

Members

Corporate 
 Dynetics
 AZ Technology
 Science Applications International Corporation (SAIC)
 Alliant Techsystems
 Gray Research
 Lockheed Martin
 Polaris Sensor Technologies
 Sirote & Permutt
 Beason & Nalley
 Draper Laboratory

Government
 Aviation and Missile Research, Development, and Engineering Center
 NASA
 Missile Defense Agency
 Tennessee Valley Authority

University
 Alabama A&M University
 Auburn University
 Tuskegee University
 University of Alabama
 University of Alabama at Birmingham
 University of Alabama in Huntsville
 University of South Alabama

References

External links
 

Huntsville, Alabama
Defense companies of the United States